José Miguel "Josemi" Castañeda Macho (born 26 February 1998) is a Spanish professional footballer who plays as a central midfielder for Romanian club Farul II Constanța.

Club career
Born in Suances, Cantabria, Castañeda joined Racing de Santander's youth academy in 2008, from SD Amistad. He made his senior debut with the reserves on 21 August 2016, starting in a 5–1 Tercera División home rout of Selaya FC.

Castañeda scored his first senior goal on 12 October 2016, opening in a 3–4 away loss against CF Vimenor. He played his first competitive match with the first team on 20 November, coming on as a second-half substitute for Sergio Ruiz in a 0–0 home draw with Arandina CF in the Segunda División B.

On 10 July 2017, Castañeda signed with UD Las Palmas and was assigned to the B side in the third division. On 17 June 2020, he made his professional debut by replacing Slavoljub Srnić in a 1–0 Segunda División away victory over UD Almería.

On 1 September 2020, Castañeda agreed to a three-year contract with Romanian Liga I club FC Viitorul Constanța.

References

External links

1998 births
Living people
Spanish footballers
Footballers from Cantabria
Association football midfielders
Segunda División players
Segunda División B players
Tercera División players
Rayo Cantabria players
Racing de Santander players
UD Las Palmas Atlético players
UD Las Palmas players
Liga I players
Liga III players
FC Viitorul Constanța players
FCV Farul Constanța players
Spanish expatriate footballers
Expatriate footballers in Romania
Spanish expatriate sportspeople in Romania